Football at the 2007 South Pacific Games in Apia, Samoa was held from 25 August to 7 September 2007.

Medal summary

Medal table

Results

See also 

 Football at the 2007 South Pacific Games – Men's tournament
 Football at the 2007 South Pacific Games – Women's tournament

References 

 
2007 South Pacific Games
Pacific Games
2007
2007 South Pacific Games